Scrisul Românesc is a Romanian publishing house, founded in 1922 in Craiova.

References

External links
 Scrisul Românesc Homepage

1922 establishments in Romania
Mass media in Craiova
Book publishing companies of Romania
Publishing companies established in 1922
Companies based in Craiova